Alexander Lugo (born July 7, 1979) is a Colombian footballer who plays for FC Alcarràs.  He previously played for Deportes Tolima and Cortulua in Colombia and C.D. Chalatenango in El Salvador.

References

External links
 Profile at BDFA.com.ar

1979 births
Living people
Colombian footballers
Deportes Tolima footballers
Cortuluá footballers
Academia F.C. players
C.D. Chalatenango footballers
Colombian expatriate footballers
Expatriate footballers in El Salvador
Association football forwards
Footballers from Cali